John Brackenridge may refer to:
John Brackenridge (clergyman) (1772–1844), Presbyterian chaplain of the United States Congress
John Brackenridge (baseball) (1880–1953), American baseball pitcher

See also
John Breckinridge (disambiguation)